The Green Line is the second line of the Jerusalem Light Rail, under construction as of 2018, with completion of the full line expected by 2025. The  Green Line will link the two campuses of the Hebrew University of Jerusalem and continue south via Pat junction to Gilo. It will pass the terminus of the Tel Aviv–Jerusalem railway, then cross the existing Red Line tram route and run to Mount Scopus. There will be 35 stops, and ridership is predicted at 200,000 passengers/day. The line was approved by the Jerusalem city council in June 2016, with tenders to be issued shortly after.

A 60 million NIS tender has been issued to start infrastructure work and buildings support walls, development, and paving work along the route.

The full tender for operation is estimated at 10 billion NIS is in pre-selection phase.

Moriah Jerusalem Development CEO Doron Noiwirt stated, "At least three more tenders for the next sections of the Green Line will be issued in 2017".

Only two consortia submitted bids for the line's construction after the Alstom-Dan-Electra consortium pulled out. 

The tender was won in August 2019 by TransJerusalem J-Net Ltd., owned by Shapir Engineering and Spanish rail firm CAF.

See also
Jerusalem Light Rail
Red Line (Jerusalem Light Rail)

References

External links

 The Green Line - תוכנית אב לתחבורה

Light rail in Israel